Daejeo Station is a station of the Busan Metro Line 3 and BGLRT Line located in Daejeo-dong, Gangseo District, Busan, South Korea. It is a southern terminus of Line 3 at this station. During the construction, the Line 3 Station was known as Jungni Station, and Busan-Gimhae Light Rail Station known as Seoyeonjeong Station.

Station Layout

Exits

References

External links 
 Cyber station information, Line 3 from Busan Transportation Corporation 
 Cyber station information, BGLRT Line from Busan Transportation Corporation 

Busan Metro stations
Gangseo District, Busan
Railway stations opened in 2005
Railway stations opened in 2011
2005 establishments in South Korea